Kyauk-o is a village in Mingin Township, Kale District, in the Sagaing Region of western Burma. It lies south of Kabyit.

References

External links
Maplandia World Gazetteer

Populated places in Kale District
Mingin Township